Central University of Haryana is a central university in Jant-Pali villages, just  from the City of Mahendragarh in Mahendragarh district of Haryana, India, has been established by an Act of Parliament: "The Central Universities Act, 2009" by the Government of India. The territorial jurisdiction of Central University of Haryana is for the whole of the Haryana. The first Convocation of the university was held on 1 March 2014. It is one of the 15 Central Universities established by MHRD, GoI.

The university operates from  campus in Jant-Pali villages, Mahendergarh district,  from the Mahendergarh on the Mahendergarh-Bhiwani road. Prof. (Dr.) Tankeshwar Kumar is the current vice-chancellor of the university.

History
A Union University or Central University in India is established by the Department of Higher Education, normally by the Act of Parliament, unlike most universities which are established by state governments. This university was established under 12 more proposed Central Universities in Bihar, Gujarat, Haryana, Himachal Pradesh, Jammu and Kashmir, Jharkhand, Karnataka, Kerala, Orissa, Punjab, Rajasthan and Tamil Nadu in the year 2009 through an Act of Parliament: "The Central Universities Act, 2009" by the Government of India.
The Central Universities Bill 2009 aims at creating one new central university each in Bihar, Gujarat, Haryana, Himachal Pradesh, Jammu and Kashmir, Jharkhand, Karnataka, Kerala, Orissa, Punjab, Rajasthan and Tamil Nadu. It also seeks to convert Guru Ghasidas Vishwavidyalaya in Chhattisgarh, Harisingh Gour Vishwavidyalaya in Sagar (Madhya Pradesh) and Hemwati Nandan Bahuguna Garhwal University in Uttarakhand into Central universities.

Organisation and administration

Governance
The president of India is the visitor of the university.

Departments
There are 11 Schools (30 Departments) in the university under which Graduation, Post Graduate, M.Phil. and Ph.D. courses are offered. The admission are entirely through Central University Common Entrance Test commonly known as CUET. The available Schools are:
 School of Humanities and Social Sciences
 School of Interdisciplinary and Applied Sciences
 School of Life-Long Learning
 School of Basic Science
 School of Business and Management Studies
 School of Language, Linguistics, Culture and Heritage
 School of Law, Governance, Public Policy and Management
 School of Engineering and Technology
 School of Education

The available Departments are:
Department of Geography and Geoinformatics
Department of English and Foreign Languages
Department of Hindi
Department of History and Archaeology
Department of Journalism and Mass Communication
Department of Political Science
Department of Psychology
Department of Sociology
Department of Biochemistry
Department of Biotechnology
Department of Microbiology
Department of Nutrition Biology
Department of Pharmaceutical science
Department of Environmental Science
Department of Library and information science
Department of Yoga
Department of Chemistry
Department of Computer science and Information Technology
Department of Mathematics
Department of Physics and Astrophysics
Department of Statistics
Department of Law
Department of Management studies
Department of Economics
Department of Commerce
Department of Tourism and Hotel Management
Department of Engineering and Technology
Department of Education
Department of Vocational studies and Skill Development

Controversy

Land fraud 
When the land for the university was leased out by the villagers for a nominal rent, local and state leaders promised that the local villagers will be given priority for admission and jobs. Since then, M.M.Pallam Raju, Union Minister for Human Resource Development, has told the villagers that the Central Universities Act, 2009, does not allow reservations for jobs based on domicile. The people felt cheated and no relief was given to them.

RSS leader speech 
The university came under controversy and criticism when a senior leader of the Rashtriya Swayamsevak Sangh (RSS), Sunil Ambekar, presented a conference on "research methodology" without a research degree and as a chief guest organized by Central University of Haryana. Several scholars have questioned the option and asked if it comes under pressure from the government.

See also
 State University of Performing And Visual Arts
 State Institute of Film and Television
 Central University, India

References

External links
 

Mahendragarh district
Central universities in India
Central University of Haryana
2009 establishments in Haryana
Educational institutions established in 2009
Haryana